is a 1958 Japanese film directed by Teinosuke Kinugasa. It was entered into the 1959 Cannes Film Festival.

Cast
 Fujiko Yamamoto - Oshino
 Keizo Kawasaki - Junichi Inaki
 Yosuke Irie - Takashi Irie
 Shūji Sano - Kumajirō Gosaka
 Hitomi Nozoe - Nanae Date
 Hideo Takamatsu - Yokichi Tatsumi
 Eijirō Tono
 Tamae Kiyokawa - Hideko Gosaka
 Rieko Sumi - Wakakichi

References

External links

1958 films
Japanese drama films
1950s Japanese-language films
Films directed by Teinosuke Kinugasa
Films produced by Masaichi Nagata
1950s Japanese films